Greenwood Gardens is a  formal Italianate garden located in the Short Hills section of Millburn, in Essex County, New Jersey, United States.

History

Joseph Day, a prominent real estate auctioneer, purchased  of land in 1906, dubbed "Pleasant Days". Construction on Day's home was designed by William W. Renwick and built by Rafael Guastavino's Guastavino Fireproof Construction Company. The property remained with Days until his death in 1944, whereupon a majority of the land was purchased by Peter B. Blanchard Jr. and was rechristened The Greenwoods. Blanchard's stewardship of the land saw significant aesthetic and horticultural changes, beginning with the demolition of the Days' Mediterranean-style mansion and the construction of a Colonial-Revival style home. The Blanchard's were also primarily responsible for the growth and diversification of the namesake gardens on the property, planting hundreds of ornamental trees and shrubs.

After Peter Blanchard died in 2000 and in accordance with his wishes, Greenwood Gardens was designated a nonprofit organization and is one of 16 gardens nationwide that is supported by The Garden Conservancy. The following years saw the beginnings of a comprehensive renovation of the property; efforts were made to refurbish the forecourt, retaining walls and many of the statues and assorted ornamentation.

Notable features
Greenwood Gardens is home to several unique architectural and artistic creations. Two of the most prominent works of art on the property are a wrought iron gate featuring a bird, vines and assorted plants created by Samuel Yellin, and a bronze statue of a boy holding two geese created by Emilio Angela. In addition to the main house the property boasts a summerhouse and teahouse constructed in 1920, and several cottages meant to house workers to maintain the grounds.

Admission
Prospective visitors can gain access to the garden through a one-time admission fee, or by becoming a member of the Gardens. Greenwood Gardens hosts periodic events including educational tours and musical events.

References

External links

Gardens in New Jersey
Millburn, New Jersey
1906 establishments in New Jersey